Jaganmohini is a 1978 Telugu-language drama film produced and directed by B. Vittalacharya. The movie was a remake of the 1951 Kannada movie Jaganmohini. The film stars Narasimha Raju, Prabha and Jayamalini. The film was dubbed in Tamil. Jaganmohini became a major hit and even performed better than the films of big stars. The movie had the best visual effects according to Indian standards at that time.

This is the story of woman betrayed by a king, who reappears in her next life as a ghost intent on possessing him. On the advice of a priest, the king marries a pious woman who matches her devotional prowess against the ghost's seductions and wins.

Plot
Raja (Narasimha Raju) was a king in his previous life. When he goes to the forest once to hunt animals, he gets attracted to an orphan stick selling lady Mohini (Jayamalini) and lusts after her. He seduces her and enjoys having sex with her in the forest. After a week he leaves her in the forest itself promising that he would return to marry her and will make her his queen. But Raja is a lustful womanizer and he just betrayed Mohini. Knowing this Mohini commits suicide vowing that she will return to get him in his next life. Raja in his next birth goes to the same  forest to drink water where Jaganmohini, now a ghost, appears to him and lures him with her beauty. But he is married to another pious woman (Prabha). She regains him by praying to her Goddess, whom she believes in strongly. In the process, she is turned to into the form of an old woman and later into the form of a snake by Jaganmohini to obstruct her prayers. But, with the help of another pious ghost, and her brother-in-law, who is also turned into a sheep by Jaganmohini, she regains her original form and finishes her prayers at Srisailam.  Jagan Mohini at last gets her "moksham" and goes to heaven.

Cast
 Savitri as Raja's mother
 Jayamalini as Jaganmohini
 Narasimha Raju as Raja		
 Prabha as Raja's wife		
 Vijayalakshmi		
 Dhulipala Seetharama Sastry as Raja's father		
 Sarathi as Raja's friend			
 A. Satyanarayana		
 Athili Lakshmi		
 Mukkamala		
 Balakrishna
 Jayachandran		
 Anita
 Duttaluri RamaRao

References

External links
 
 Jaganmohini on Youtube

1978 films
Indian ghost films
Films about reincarnation
Indian historical horror films
1970s Telugu-language films
Telugu remakes of Kannada films
Films directed by B. Vittalacharya